

Events 
 June – At a Corpus Christi procession in Pátzcuaro, Morelia, Mexico, the earliest extant zarabanda was sung.
Orlande de Lassus joins the court of Albrecht V, Duke of Bavaria.

Publications 
Julien Belin –  (Paris: Nicolas du Chemin), a collection of intabulations for the lute
Pierre Cadéac – Mass for four voices (Paris: Nicolas du Chemin)
Jacob Clemens non Papa
First book of masses:  for four voices (Leuven: Pierre Phalèse), possibly published posthumously
Fifth book of motets for five voices (Paris: Simon du Bosc), possibly published posthumously
 I, II, & III for three voices (Antwerp: Tielman Susato), settings of Psalms in Dutch, possibly published posthumously
Jhan Gero – Second book of madrigals for three voices (Venice: Antonio Gardano)
Claude Gervaise, ed. – Third book of dances for four instruments (Paris: widow of Pierre Attaingnant)
Philibert Jambe de Fer – 
Clément Janequin –  (Paris: Le Roy & Ballard)
Orlande de Lassus – First book of motets for five and six voices (Antwerp: Johann Laet)
Pierre de Manchicourt –  for four voices (Paris: Nicolas du Chemin)
Annibale Padovano – First book of ricercars for four voices (Venice: Antonio Gardano), a collection of vocal partsongs

Classical music

Births 
February 21 – Sethus Calvisius, German theorist and composer (died 1615)
June – Pomponio Nenna, Neapolitan Italian composer (died 1608)
August 10 – Philipp Nicolai, German pastor and composer (died 1608)
December 17 – Abdul Rahim Khan-I-Khana, composer and a minister of the Mughal emperor Akbar (died 1627)

Deaths 
March 4 – Leonhard Kleber, German organist (born 1495)
May 7 – Hieronymus Andreae (alias Formschneider), German printer of music, amongst other things
June 10 – Martin Agricola, German theorist and composer (born 1486)

References

 
Music
16th century in music
Music by year